Bitwig Studio is a proprietary digital audio workstation developed by Bitwig GmbH. Bitwig is available for Linux, macOS, and Windows. Bitwig is designed to be an instrument for live performances as well as a tool for composing, recording, arranging, mixing, and mastering. It offers a suite of controls for beatmatching, crossfading, and other effects used by turntablists. Bitwig supports both traditional linear music arrangement and non-linear (clip-based) production. It has multi-monitor and touch screen support. Bitwig is notable for its strong modulation, and automation capabilities. The current stable version of Bitwig is "Bitwig Studio 4.4.x". In 2017, Bitwig Studio was named DAW of the year by Computer Music magazine.

History 

Bitwig was founded and developed in Berlin by Claes Johanson, Pablo Sara, Nicholas Allen and Volker Schumacher in 2009. Since 2010, Placidus Schelbert has been the CEO after he left his position as an International Sales Manager at Ableton, in the same year.

In 2022 Bitwig GmbH was one of the main sponsors for a new audio plug-in interface, CLAP.

See also 
 Ableton Live
 List of music software

References

External links
 

Music production software
Electronic music software
Audio recording software
Audio software with JACK support
Linux
Audio editing software for Linux
Digital audio editors for Linux
Digital audio workstation software
Linux software
MacOS audio editors
MacOS multimedia software
Music looping
Windows multimedia software